Giorgi Merebashvili (born 15 August 1986) is a Georgian professional footballer who plays as a midfielder for Polish club Podbeskidzie Bielsko-Biała's reserves team.

Club career
Born in Tbilisi, Merebashvili began his professional career in 2005 with Dinamo Tbilisi. He played there for five seasons, making 108 league appearances and scored 36 goals. During the 2008–09 season he was, along with team-mate Ilija Spasojević, the club's top scorer in that season, with 13 goals, quite an achievement for a midfielder.

In January 2010, he moved to Serbian club Vojvodina where he joined his compatriot Mikheil Khutsishvili. He immediately entered into the first team finishing the half season with 15 appearances, with Vojvodina finishing fifth in the league. In the Cup they reached the 2009–10 Serbian Cup final against Red Star Belgrade.

During the 2010–11 Serbian SuperLiga Merebashvili became the anchor of the team. He ended the season with 25 appearances and his scoring skills came out again, as he scored 7 goals in the league during the season. Vojvodina finished the season in 3rd place, and they lost the 2010–11 Serbian Cup final in a polemical match against Partizan in which his team left the pitch in the 80th minute because of dubious referee decisions.

Merebashvili made an oral agreement with Veria on 25 June 2015. On 8 July 2015 was judged as innocent for the fixed match case against Olympiacos and Merebashvili's contract was activated. Merebashvili debuted on 23 August 2015 against PAS Giannina as he came on from the bench as a substitute at minute sixty. Merebashvili's effort in an away 0–1 win against Kalloni, at minute 90+2' earned Veria a penalty that Djamel Abdoun converted to goal, giving Veria the victory.

International career
Merebashvili earned his first cap with the Georgian national team against Portugal in Viseu on 31 May 2008. Since then, Merebashvili became a usual presence in the team by counting 15 appearances by end of 2010.

International goals
Scores and results list Georgia's goal tally first.

Honours

Club
Dinamo Tbilisi
Georgian League: 2007–08, 2012–13, 2013–14
Georgian Cup: 2009, 2013, 2014
Georgian Super Cup: 2008, 2014

Individual
Georgian Footballer of the Year: 2010

References

External links
 
 
 Giorgi Merebashvili Stats at Utakmica.rs
 

1986 births
Living people
Footballers from Tbilisi
Footballers from Georgia (country)
Association football midfielders
Georgia (country) international footballers
FC Dinamo Tbilisi players
FK Vojvodina players
OFI Crete F.C. players
Veria F.C. players
Levadiakos F.C. players
Wisła Płock players
Podbeskidzie Bielsko-Biała players
Sandecja Nowy Sącz players
Serbian SuperLiga players
Super League Greece players
Ekstraklasa players
I liga players
Expatriate footballers from Georgia (country)
Expatriate footballers in Serbia
Expatriate footballers in Poland
Expatriate sportspeople from Georgia (country) in Poland
Georgia (country) under-21 international footballers